"Why" is a song by American singer Lionel Richie. It was written by Richie along with Sean Garrett and Chuckii Booker for his eighth studio album Coming Home (2006). Production on the song was helmed by Richie and Garrett, while Booker is credited as a co-producer. "Why" was initially considered as the album's second single, but "What You Are" became the official selection. In the United Kingdom, the song was released as the album's third single in December 2006.

Track listing

Notes
 signifies a co-producer

References 

2006 singles
Lionel Richie songs
2006 songs
Island Records singles
Mercury Records singles
Songs written by Lionel Richie
Songs written by Sean Garrett
Songs written by Chuckii Booker